Lake Wakuach is a lake in northern Quebec, Canada.

Lakes of Nord-du-Québec